The honey locust (Gleditsia triacanthos),  also known as the thorny locust or thorny honeylocust, is a deciduous tree in the family Fabaceae, native to central North America where it is mostly found in the moist soil of river valleys. Honey locust is highly adaptable to different environments, has been introduced worldwide, and can be an aggressive, invasive species outside of its native range.

Description 

They exhibit fast growth, but live a medium life span of about 120 years. The leaves are pinnately compound on older trees but bipinnately compound on vigorous young trees. They turn yellow in the autumn. Honey locusts leaf out relatively late in spring, but generally slightly earlier than the black locust (Robinia pseudoacacia). The strongly scented, cream-colored flowers appear in late spring, in clusters emerging from the base of the leaf axils. The trees are polygamodioecious: most are strictly dioecious with male and female flowers on separate trees though some have bisexual flowers with a few male or female flowers on the same tree.

The fruit of the honey locust is a flat legume (pod) that matures in early autumn. The seeds are dispersed by grazing herbivores such as cattle and horses, which eat the pod pulp and excrete the seeds in droppings; the animal's digestive system assists in breaking down the hard seed coat, making germination easier. In addition, the seeds are released in the host's manure, providing fertilizer for them. Honey locust seed pods ripen in late spring and germinate rapidly when temperatures are warm enough.

The thorns are fairly soft and green when young, harden and turn red as they age, then fade to ash grey and turn brittle when mature. These thorns are thought to have evolved to protect the trees from browsing Pleistocene megafauna, which may also have been involved in seed dispersal, but the size and spacing of them is less useful in defending against smaller extant herbivores such as deer. Thornless forms (Gleditsia triacanthos var. inermis) are occasionally found growing wild and are available as nursery plants. Hybridization of honey locust with water locust (G. aquatica) has been reported.

Cultivation and history 
Its cultivars are popular ornamental plants, especially in the northern plains of North America where few other trees can survive and prosper. It tolerates urban conditions, compacted soil, road salt, alkaline soil, heat, and drought. The popularity is in part due to the fact that it transplants so easily. The fast growth rate and tolerance of poor site conditions make it valued in areas where shade is wanted quickly, such as new parks or housing developments, and in disturbed and reclaimed environments, such as mine tailings. Cultivars with narrow upright growth habit, such as Northern Sentinel, are especially prized as street trees. It is resistant to spongy moths but is defoliated by another pest, the mimosa webworm. Spider mites, cankers, and galls are a problem with some trees. Many cultivated varieties do not have thorns.

Agriculture 
The species is a major invasive environmental and economic weed in agricultural regions of Australia. The plant forms thickets and destroys the pasture required for livestock to survive. The thickets choke waterways and prevent both domestic and native animals from drinking and also harbour vermin. The spines cause damage to both people and domestic and native wildlife and puncture vehicle tires. In much of the Midwest of the United States the honey locust is also considered a weed tree and a pest that establishes itself in farm fields. In other regions of the world, ranchers and farmers who employ monocropping deem honey locust a nuisance weed; its fast growth allows it to out-compete grasses and other crops.

Uses

Food 

The pulp on the inside of the pods is edible (unlike the black locust, which is toxic) and consumed by wildlife and livestock.

Despite its name, the honey locust is not a significant honey plant. The name derives from the sweet taste of the legume pulp, which was used for food and traditional medicine by Native American people, and can also be used to make tea. The long pods, which eventually dry and ripen to brown or maroon, are surrounded in a tough, leathery skin that adheres strongly to the pulp within. The pulp—bright green in unripe pods—is strongly sweet, crisp and succulent in ripe pods. Dark brown tannin-rich beans are found in slots within the pulp. Likewise, its edible seed has nutritional potential, and the flour made from its cotyledons constitutes a food source with various potential uses for pastry and bakery, among other gastronomic uses.

Timber 

Honey locusts produce a high quality, durable wood that polishes well, but the tree does not grow in sufficient numbers to support a bulk industry. However, a niche market exists for honey locust furniture. It is also used for posts and rails because of the dense, rot-resistant nature of the wood. In the past, the hard thorns of the younger trees were used as nails and the wood itself was used to fashion treenails for shipbuilding.

Nitrogen fixation 
The ability of Gleditsia to fix nitrogen is disputed. Many scientific sources state that Gleditsia does not fix nitrogen. Some support this statement with the fact that Gleditsia does not form root nodules with symbiotic bacteria, the assumption being that without nodulation, no nitrogen fixation can occur. In contrast, many popular sources, permaculture publications in particular, claim that Gleditsia does fix nitrogen but by some other mechanism.

There are anatomical, ecological, and taxonomic indications of nitrogen fixation in non-nodulating legumes. Both nodulating and non-nodulating species have been observed to grow well in nitrogen-poor soil with non-nodulating legumes even dominating some sites. The litter and seeds of non-nodulating species contain levels of nitrogen higher than non-legumes and sometimes even higher than nodulating legumes growing on the same site. How this happens is not yet well understood but there have been some observations of nitrogenase activity in non-nodulating leguminous plants, including honey locust. Electron microscopy indicates the presence of clusters around the inner cortex of roots, just outside the xylem, that resemble colonies of rhizobial bacterioids. These may well constitute the evolutionary precursors in legumes for nitrogen fixation through nodulation. It is not known whether the non-nodulating nitrogen fixation, if it exists, benefits neighboring plants as is said to be the case with nodulating legumes.

Research
In research using databases, more than 60 phytochemicals were identified from honey locust, including polyphenols, triterpenes, sterols, and saponins, with in vitro studies assessing for possible biological activity.

References

Further reading

External links 

 Gleditsia triacanthos images at bioimages.vanderbilt.edu
 Gleditsia triacanthos images at Forestry Images
 Gleditsia triacanthos at the USDA Plants Database

Edible legumes
Garden plants of North America
Gleditsia
Nearctic realm flora
Ornamental trees
Plants described in 1753
Plants used in Native American cuisine
Plants used in traditional Native American medicine
Trees of humid continental climate
Trees of Ontario
Trees of the Eastern United States
Trees of the North-Central United States
Trees of the Northeastern United States
Trees of the Plains-Midwest (United States)
Trees of the Southeastern United States
Trees of the United States